José Augusto Trinidad Martínez Ruiz, better known by his pseudonym Azorín  (June 8, 1873 – March 2, 1967), was a Spanish novelist, essayist and literary critic. As a political radical in the 1890s, he moved steadily to the right. In literature he attempted to define the eternal qualities of Spanish life. His essays and criticism are written in a simple, compact style. Particularly notable are his impressionistic descriptions of Castilian towns and landscapes.

Early life and education
José Martínez Ruiz was born in the village of Monòver, Spain in the province of Alicante on 8 June 1873. He was the oldest of nine children and enjoyed reading in his youth. His father, a middle-class lawyer, was an active conservative politician and later became a representative and mayor, and a follower of Romero Robledo. His mother, a landowner, was born in nearby Petrel. From the age of eight, until he was 16, he attended a boarding school run by the Escolapius Fathers (Piarists) in his father's home town of Yecla in the province of Murcia. 

From 1888 to 1896 he studied law at the University of Valencia, but did not complete his studies. Thereafter he began to write, publishing a monograph on literary criticism in 1893. Here he began to write for local newspapers, contributing articles to the radical journal El pueblo, edited by Vicente Blasco Ibáñez. He became interested in the ideas of Karl Krause, who argued that man could be reformed through education, and that openness to other nations' cultures could overcome national conservatism.

In 1895, Ruiz published Anarquistas literarios and Notas sociales, in which he presented the main anarchist theories of the time. During this time he was a political radical. Ruiz became an admirer of the liberal Prime Minister Antonio Maura, who fought the culture of "caciques" (local political bosses), and who had become the figurehead of a youth movement, the Mauristas, who wanted him as a new head of state of Spain at a time of substantial resentment of King Alfonso XIII.

Career, writing and political evolution
Ruiz’s journalism developed on moving to Madrid in 1896. He wrote for the republican newspaper El País until he was dismissed for his radicalism in February 1897. He also wrote for the Paris-based anarchist magazine La Campaña, and other Spanish journals including El Progreso ("Progress"), and El Imparcial ("The impartial"). His output during this period displayed anti-establishment views, including anarchist ideas, seeing writing as a catalyst for change, and depreciating aesthetics and faith.
However, by 1899 his outlook was beginning to change. His work began to display a new philosophical and artistic consciousness, and an interest in the past. His book El alma castellana (The Castilian Soul), and his essay collections, La ruta de Don Quijote (The Route of Don Quixote) and, much later, Una hora de España 1560–1590 (Spain's Hour, 1560–1590) capture the essence of being Spanish.  He was abandoning revolutionary ideas, but becoming more nihilist, though respecting the dignity of human beings, and using irony to stand at arm's length from the world. This pessimism would eventually lead him to a period of political conservatism

In 1902 he published the first of three intensely biographical novels, La voluntad (Volition), followed by Antonio Azorín, and Las confesiones de un pequeño filósofo (The Confessions of a Minor Philosopher). Early in his career, Ruiz had used pen names, such as Cándido (in honor of Voltaire) and Ahrimán (the Persian god of destruction), and in 1904 he discarded his own name and began to use the surname of one of his characters, "Azorín". Using mostly short sentences, in both his fiction and his essays he emphasized the small but enduring elements and events in history and in one's life. In his view, time consisted of a series of repetitions, a notion of time described as "timeless". He married Julia Guinda Urzanqui in 1908; she was to remain beside him for the rest of life and outlive him. She died in 1974 aged 98. They had no children. By 1913 he was writing for ABC, the popular pro-monarchy, conservative newspaper, including a series of articles on “La generación de 1898” (Generation of 98), a literary and artistic group to which he belonged.
Ruiz served as a conservative deputy in the Cortes Generales  from 1907 to 1919, eventually becoming an under-secretary for the Ministry of Public Instruction. He gave up politics in opposition to the dictatorship of Gen. Primo de Rivera, though he never opposed him publicly. He had by now become noted as a drama critic and essayist. His literary criticism, such as Al margen de los clásicos (Marginal Notes to the Classics), Don Juan and Doña Inés, helped to open up new avenues of literary taste and to arouse a new enthusiasm for the Spanish classics at a time when a large portion of Spanish literature was virtually unavailable to the public.  In 1924, he was elected to the Real Academia Española. His first of a dozen plays, Old Spain, appeared in 1926, followed by Brandy mucho brandy and La comedia del arte, but had difficulty in adapting his slow and meticulous style to the dynamics and rhythm of drama. A wry comedy about journalists increasing newspaper sales by inventing stories, El Clamor (The Cry), led to the leadership of the Asociación de la Prensa expelling him, an act which Azorín likened to that of the Inquisition. He began to be influenced by the avant-garde movement, experimenting in a personal version of surrealism in a short trilogy, Lo invisible (The Invisible).

The outbreak of the Republic saw him re-adopt his old progressive political ideals. He abandoned ABC to write for the republican newspapers El Sol, La Libertad and Ahora). He edited Revista de Occidente, founded by José Ortega y Gasset, a journal promoting European philosophy, from 1923 to 1936. At the outset of the Spanish Civil War, in 1936, Azorín fled to Paris, where he continued his literary career writing for the Argentine newspaper La Nación. A book reflecting on this period of exile, Españoles en París, was published in 1939.

When he returned to Spain on 23 August 1939, he found himself in "inner exile", along with other intellectuals who had not overtly supported the Franco regime during the conflict. He was at first denied a press identification card (tarjeta de periodista), but was supported by Ramón Serrano Suñer, at that time Franco's Interior Minister and president of the Falange. Accepting Franco’s regime was the price he had to pay in order to be admitted back, and he aligned with the dictatorship in a noted article in the right-wing journal Vértice. He contributed again to ABC from 1941 to 1962. He published numerous new works which were redolent of his earlier literary successes, including Pensando en España and Sintiendo España.

Later life 
In his old age, Azorín became a film enthusiast, writing numerous articles, some of which are reprinted in El cine y el momento, and claiming that "Cinema is the greatest form of art". He died in Madrid, Spain on March 2, 1967, at the age of 93.

The political evolution that transformed Ruiz, a committed journalist as well as a revolutionary anarchist, into Azorín, a conservative member of parliament, as well as a sceptic and indulgent writer intimidated by Franco's regime, is key to understanding the division of his critics. Two different images of him were sustained, successive and irreconcilable personalities that cannot be studied at the same time without understanding the contradictions.

Honors
 1917, Hijo Predilecto de Monòver.
1924, Elected to the Royal Spanish Academy
 1946, Grand Cross of the Order of Isabella the Catholic
 1956, Grand Cross of the Civil Order of Alfonso X, the Wise.
 1969, His home in Monòver established as a museum, Casa-Museo Azorín

Publications

See also 

 List of essayists
 List of Spanish writers
 List of Spanish-language authors

References

Further reading

External links 
 
  
  

1873 births
1967 deaths
People from Vinalopó Mitjà
Writers from the Valencian Community
Spanish male writers
Members of the Royal Spanish Academy
Knights Grand Cross of the Order of Isabella the Catholic
Recipients of the Civil Order of Alfonso X, the Wise
University of Salamanca alumni